Shathira Jakir Jessy (born 30 November 1990) is a Bangladeshi former cricketer who played as a right-arm off break bowler. She appeared in two One Day Internationals and one Twenty20 International for Bangladesh between 2011 and 2013. She played domestic cricket for Rangpur Division.

Career

ODI career
Jakir made her ODI debut against Ireland on 26 November 2011.

T20I career
Jakir made her T20I debut against South Africa on 15 September 2013.

Asian games
Jakir was a member of the team that won a silver medal in cricket against the China national women's cricket team at the 2010 Asian Games in Guangzhou, China.

References

External links
 
 

1990 births
Living people
People from Lalmonirhat District
Bangladeshi women cricketers
Bangladesh women One Day International cricketers
Bangladesh women Twenty20 International cricketers
Rangpur Division women cricketers
Asian Games silver medalists for Bangladesh
Medalists at the 2010 Asian Games
Cricketers at the 2010 Asian Games
Asian Games medalists in cricket